HD 141846 is a double star in the southern constellation of Apus. As of 1996, the pair have an angular separation of 0.7″ along a position angle of 332°.

References

External links
 Image HD 141846
 www.chara.gsu.edu/

Apus (constellation)
141846
Double stars
F-type subgiants
Durchmusterung objects
078360